R. J. Reynolds Tobacco Company is an American tobacco company.

RJR may also refer to:
RJR-MacDonald Inc v Canada (AG), a Supreme Court of Canada case involving the tobacco company
RJR Nabisco, from which the tobacco company was split
RJR-2429'' a drug that acts as an agonist at neural nicotinic acetylcholine receptors
RJR 94 FM, a broadcast company in Jamaica
RJR Airdrome, Inc., owner of Chandelle Estates Airport in Delaware